The Malaysian Solidarity Consolidation Committee was an organisation formed by political leaders from Malaya and northern Borneo, who favoured the creation of Malaysia. The Committee held its first meeting on 25 August 1961, in Jesselton, Sabah.

References

History of Malaysia since Independence